Kauser Edappagath is an Indian judge who is presently serving as a judge of Kerala High Court. The High Court of Kerala is the highest court in the Indian state of Kerala and in the Union Territory of Lakshadweep. The High Court of Kerala is headquartered at Ernakulam, Kochi. He was serving as the Principal District and Sessions Judge, Ernakulam before being elevated as the judge of Kerala High Court.

Early life and education
Justice Edappagath was born in Kerala.  He completed his schooling from M.M. Uloom U.P.School, Kannur and Government City High School, Kannur. He graduated from Sir Syed College (Taliparamba), obtained law degree from Government Law College, Kozhikode and post graduation in law in Contracts from Mahatma Gandhi University, Kerala. 

In 2005 he has finished International Accredited Mediation Training Course conducted jointly by Mediation Council, U.K., ADR Chamber, U.K. and Hamline University School of Law in association with Indian Institute of Arbitration and Mediation. 

In 2007 he did his paper presentation at International Family Law Conference organized by International Islamic University Malaysia held at Kuala Lumpur, Malaysia. He was awarded Ph.D in Law by the Indian Law Institute, New Delhi in 2012.

Career
After enrollment Edappagath started his practice at Kannur and later extended to High Court of Kerala in 2002 and in 1997 he along with A. Muhamed Mustaque established a law firm named MK Associates. He was directly recruited from Bar as District and Sessions Judge in 2009. Thereafter, he served as Additional District and Sessions Judge at Thiruvananthapuram, Additional District and Sessions Judge/Forest Tribunal at Kozhikode, as Special Judge, CBI/NIA and Principal District and Sessions Judge/State Transport Appellate Tribunal, Ernakulam from where he was elevated as Additional Judge of High Court of Kerala on 25.02.2021 and became permeant judge from 06.06.2022.

Notable rulings

COVID-19 pandemic
In 2021 Vacation Bench of Kerala High Court, consisting of Justice Devan Ramachandran and Justice Edapagath took up several important issues with respect to the COVID-19 pandemic such as banning of victory and congratulatory processions/parades of all political parties after the State Legislature election results were announced on 02.05.2021, suo motu directed State Police Chief to avoid crowding of people at all Vaccination centres and issued various directions to Government to control private hospitals and to regulate their treatment costs and a suggestion was also made by the bench to takeover 50% beds of all private hospitals for COVID patients. A timely intervention was made by the bench consisting of Justice Mustaque and Justice Edapagath directing the State Government to include the practicing lawyers and advocate clerks in the priority list of COVID-19 vaccination list pointing out that purpose of inclusion of the judicial officers and staffs would become meaningless if the practicing lawyers and clerks are not included and in the very same judgment, the bench considered the concern pointed out by a single bench of the High Court regarding the measures to be taken by the concerned police officer for protection of Senior Citizen living alone and having no assistance from others shall be served with due care and assistance pointing out the death of a senior citizen happened in Palakkad, 
and bench consisting of Justice Edapagath directed the State Government to ensure the care and protection as envisaged under the Maintenance and Welfare of Parents and Senior Citizens Act, 2007 and to made available the vaccination at the residence of the Senior Citizen and bedridden patients.

Bibliography
 Divorce and Gender Equity in Muslim Personal Law of India - 2014.

References

External links
 High Court of Kerala

Living people
1968 births
Judges of the Kerala High Court
People from Kannur district
20th-century Indian judges